The 1998 Edmonton municipal election was held October 26, 1998, to elect a mayor and 12 councillors to sit on Edmonton City Council, 9 trustees to sit on the public school board, and 7 trustees to sit on the separate school board.  Edmontonians also decided one plebiscite question and participated in the Senate election.

Voter turnout

There were 172,215 ballots cast out of 482,763 eligible voters, for a voter turnout of 35.7%.

Results

(bold indicates elected, italics indicate incumbent)

Mayor

Councillors

Public school trustees

Separate (Catholic) school trustees

(Edward Wieclaw was acclaimed to the seat representing Vegreville on the board.)

Video Lottery Terminal Plebiscite

Are you in favour of Bylaw No. 1853 which says, "City Council requests the Government of Alberta through the Alberta Liquor and Gaming Commission to remove Video Lottery Terminals from the City of Edmonton?"  Vote Yes or No.

Senate Nominee Election

This was a province-wide election. Results below reflect only Edmonton vote totals; provincially, Ted Morton and Bert Brown were elected (see 1998 Alberta Senate nominee election for province-wide results).

References

City of Edmonton: Edmonton Elections

1998
1998 elections in Canada
1998 in Alberta